Man Bites God is a three-piece band from Melbourne; founded in 2000 by James Hazelden (guitar/vocals) and Chris Tomkins (drums/vocals) after the demise of Hazelden's previous band, The Drowning Hitlers. Mark Woodward (bass guitar/recorder/vocals) was soon recruited and the group were spotted playing in an unassuming Fitzroy bar (Mayfields) by Dan Brodie who insisted the band support him at St Kilda's Esplanade Hotel (the 'Espy').

The band has a catalogue of six releases: Happy Songs (EP, 2002), Ultrasounds (EP, 2002), Man Bites God (LP, 2003), Boob Job for Sweetie Pie (EP, 2005) The Popular Alternative (LP, 2005) and Peppermint Superfrog (LP, 2007); and is notorious for twisted, dark and often blasphemous sense of humour. Consequently, religious groups have been known to deface or tear down posters advertising the band's performances.

Man Bites God tours regularly throughout Australia and performed at the 2004 Edinburgh Festival Fringe. They are also played regularly on the Dr. Demento show in the USA.

Their latest album Peppermint Superfrog was released on 2 June 2007 through MGM Distribution.

The band launched a podcast called "Theatre of the World" in August 2012.

Discography
 Happy Songs (EP, 2002)
 Ultrasounds (EP, 2002)
 Man Bites God (2003)
 Boobjob for Sweetie Pie (EP, 2005)
 The Popular Alternative (2005)
 Peppermint Superfrog (2007)

Music videos
Man Bites God generally produce their own music videos as their drummer, Chris Tomkins is a professional director/editor. However some of the more recent clips have been created by long-time fan and friend of the band, Sarah Phillips. Phillips is a graduate of RMIT Animation School and member of the cult Melbourne animation guerillas, Animation Club.

 Improvise – Shot on location at the Comics Lounge, Melbourne. This video features a huge cast of Melbourne comedians performing ridiculous vaudeville style acts as the band desperately try to maintain some semblance of dignity whilst singing about extreme contraceptive measures. Features the band's former manager, Rachel Barnes, as the girl at the romantic dinner.
 Annoying Song – A surrealistic hypnotic hodge-podge of old video and super-8 footage from the band's family collections. It also features some timelapse footage shot when the band drove from Melbourne to Adelaide using a webcam mounted to the front of the van taking one shot every second for the duration of the 8-hour journey. The video was nominated for Best Independent Clip in the 2005 Belowground III Music Video Awards.
 "Bride of the Dragon" (James Hazelden) – The ballad featuring Deborah Conway is supported with a slow-moving presentation of illustrations drawn by Sydney artist, Rhiannon McGuinness. Available on YouTube.
 Cubby House – This dark, macabre clip was shot in one night with the entire budget spent on a collection of bizarre costumes and lollies for the children. This clip was lit by Sydney-based lighting designer, Allan Hirons.
 Rock n' Roll Lifestyle – Created by Sarah Phillips using drawings of manga Man Bites God band members from their 2004 Adelaide Fringe Festival show poster for "Rock n' Roll High School".

Television
Man Bites God performed the theme tune (composed by Hazelden) for the Comedy Channel's "The Adventures of Terrence and Spider" Professional Bouncers".

Man Bites God were the house band for Channel 31's live Saturday night variety show Darren & Brose. They also appeared regularly on Channel 31's Dream On.

Politics
Angered by the outcome of the 2004 Australian Federal Election, members of the band created a Macromedia Flash application entitled Man Bites God's Anger Management which allowed visitors to the band's website to blow up John Howard, the newly re-elected conservative Prime Minister. As a result, Man Bites God was named in a government report into innovative campaign methods. The report was prepared by Dr Sarah Miskin and entitled Campaigning in the 2004 Federal Election: Innovations and Traditions.

Related artists
 Rob McComb from the Triffids was guest guitarist on various songs on Ultrasounds.
 Bob Franklin performed dialogue on "Pathetique" from Man Bites God.
 Deborah Conway performed the vocals on "Bride of the Dragon" from The Popular Alternative.
 James Black from Mondo Rock and RocKwiz played electric sitar on "Girlfriend" from Peppermint Superfrog.
 Rev. Dr. Tim Harris performed the sermon on "Sleazy" from Ultrasounds.

References

External links
 Official website
 Man Bites God on Myspace
 Man Bites God on MP3.com.au
 Man Bites God's Music Videos
 Man Bites God's Podcast Series

Related links
 The Drowning Hitlers website
 GORSKYS.COMedy – Chris Tomkins' "dot.comedy" site with Liam Cody
 The Weekend People website – Mark Woodward's other musical project

Victoria (Australia) musical groups
Australian rock music groups
Australian musical trios